Stansbury Hagar (December 9, 1869, in San Francisco, California-December 23, 1942, in New York City) was an ethnologist from the United States and an authority upon Peruvian astronomy. He graduated in 1892 (Bachelor of Arts) from Yale University and in 1897 (Bachelor of Laws) from New York Law School. He was a member of many scientific societies.

Selected works

References

1869 births
1942 deaths
American ethnologists
Yale University alumni
New York Law School alumni
People from San Francisco